Apinis (feminine: Apine) is a Latvian masculine surname, derived from the Latvian word for "hop". Individuals with the surname include:

 Aigars Apinis (born 1973), paralympic athlete;

Latvian-language masculine surnames